Martin Fagan (born 26 June 1983 in Mullingar) is a retired  Irish long distance runner, who specialised in half-marathons and marathons. In 2012 he was banned for two years after testing positive for the banned performance-enhancing blood-boosting drug EPO. He made a comeback in early 2014 and managed to qualify for the marathon at the 2016 Summer Olympics, but announced in June 2015 that he had decided in to retire from running.

Achievements

References 

 

1983 births
Living people
Doping cases in athletics
Irish sportspeople in doping cases
People from Mullingar
Sportspeople from County Westmeath
Irish male long-distance runners
Olympic athletes of Ireland
Athletes (track and field) at the 2008 Summer Olympics
Providence College alumni